Equid gammaherpesvirus 5 (EHV-5), formerly Equine herpesvirus 5, is a species of virus in the genus Percavirus, subfamily Gammaherpesvirinae, family Herpesviridae, and order Herpesvirales. It is thought to be the cause of a chronic lung disease of adult horses; equine multinodular pulmonary fibrosis.

References

External links
 

Horse diseases
Gammaherpesvirinae